Thomas North (1858 – 11 September 1942) was a New Zealand cricketer. He played in eight first-class matches for Canterbury from 1893 to 1897.

See also
 List of Canterbury representative cricketers

References

External links
 

1858 births
1942 deaths
New Zealand cricketers
Canterbury cricketers
People from Crickhowell
Sportspeople from Powys